South Korean boy group Infinite has released six studio albums, two compilation albums, two live albums, two reissues, six extended plays, two single albums, and twenty-nine singles. The group debuted in South Korea in June 2010 with the mini album First Invasion and in Japan in November 2011 with a Japanese version of the song "BTD (Before the Dawn)" released as single.

Albums

Studio albums

Compilation albums

Live albums

Reissues

Single albums

Extended plays

Singles

Promotional singles

Other charted songs

Soundtrack appearances

Video albums

Videography

Music videos

Notes

References 

Discographies of South Korean artists
Discography
K-pop music group discographies